Kaja Draksler (born 6 February 1987 in Kranj, Slovenia) is a Slovenian pianist and composer.

Biography 
Draksler started playing the piano at the age of 4, and graduated from the Ljubljana High School of Music in 2005. She graduated at the Conservatory in Groningen where she studied jazz piano in 2009. Until 2013, she studied composition under Richard Ayres at the Conservatorium van Amsterdam. She wrote her final thesis on the structures within improvisation of the American pianist Cecil Taylor. She occasionally stayed in New York to have lessons with Jason Moran and Vijay Iyer.

While studying in Groningen, Draksler performed with her Acropolis Quintet. About the same time, she co-founded the BadBooshBand. Her solo performance at the Ljubljana Jazz Festival was released on CD in 2013. She performed with Susana Santos Silva at the Moers Festival. In 2016 she also played at the Moldejazz with Susana Santos Silva. At the 2017 JazzFest Berlin she impressed the audience in a trio with Petter Eldh and Christian Lillinger.

In 2007 she was a part of the European Movement Jazz Orchestra, for which she also composed music (the CD Live in Coimbra 2007).In 2007 she wrote the concert Orpheus and Eurydice for accordion and orchestra, which was premiered and recorded by Janez Dovč and the Slovenian Philharmonic. She also composed for the Metropole Orkest and the Italian Instabile Orchestra.

Style 
Draksler's music has been described as being "in the border area and in the intersection of jazz, free improvised music, classical modernism and new music". It contains some elements of folk music of the Balkans and Slovenia, functioning "in the sense of an imaginary folklore". Draksler has been heavily influenced by Cecil Taylor; whom she wrote a dissertation on.

Honors 
 2009: Draksler won the Dutch Deloitte Jazz Award.

Discography

Albums 
 2008: Akropola (Goga), with Robert Jukič, Kristijan Krajnčan, George Dumitriu, Jure Pukl, and Goran Krmac
 2010: Türkü (Goga/CDBaby), Kaja Draksler Acropolis Quartet feat. Sanem Kalfa
 2013: The Lives of Many Others (Clean Feed)
 2017: Gledalec (Clean Feed), Kaja Draksler Octet
 2021: Soothe My Soul, Feed My Thought (Idyllic Noise) Vinyl only album

Collaborations 
 2011: EMJO Live In Coimbra (Clean Feed)
 2014: The Best Of, BadBooshBand (ZKP Slovenija)
 2015: Bums, Feecho, (El Negocito Records)
 2015: Miniatures from our Living Room, Čudars-Draksler Duo (self-released)
 2016: This Love (Clean Feed Records), with Susana Santos Silva
 2017: To Pianos (Clean Feed), Kaja Draksler, Eve Risser
 2018: Punkt.Vrt.Plastik (Intakt Records), Kaja Draksler, Petter Eldh and Christian Lillinger
 2020: The Swim (Terp Records), Kaja Draksler, Terrie Ex
 2021: Somit (Intakt), Punkt.Vrt.Plastik with Petter Eldh and Christian Lillinger

References

External links 
 
 
 
 INTERVIEW: Kaja Draksler at the London Jazz News

Women jazz pianists
Slovenian jazz pianists
21st-century pianists
Slovenian jazz composers
1987 births
Living people
Clean Feed Records artists
Intakt Records artists
21st-century women pianists